Skywalker (March 4, 1982 – February 25, 2003) was an American Thoroughbred racehorse. He was best known for winning the 1986 Breeders' Cup Classic.

Background
Bred in Kentucky by Thomas P. Tatham's Oak Cliff Thoroughbreds Ltd., who also bred Sunday Silence, Skywalker was foaled on March 4, 1982 and raised at Arthur B. Hancock III's Stone Farm. Sired by Relaunch and out of the mare Bold Captive, he was named by Tatham's son for Luke Skywalker, a lead character in the Star Wars motion pictures.

Skywalker was trained by Michael Whittingham and raced under the Oak Cliff Stable partnership led by Thomas Tatham.

Racing career
Skywalker began racing in California in 1984 at age two, where he won one of his two starts and was off the board in the other. In his three-year-old campaign, he made five starts, winning twice. His most notable victory came under future U.S. Racing Hall of Fame jockey Laffit Pincay, Jr. when they won the most important West Coast race for three-year-olds, the Santa Anita Derby. He was then sent to Churchill Downs for the Kentucky Derby, where jockey Eddie Delahoussaye rode him to a sixth-place finish behind winner Spend A Buck.

In 1986, the four-year-old Skywalker had his best year in racing when he won the Longacres Mile, Mervyn Leroy Handicap, San Diego Handicap, and Breeders' Cup Classic run at California's Santa Anita Park. Ridden by Laffit Pincay, Jr., he defeated the heavy favorites Turkoman (Pat Day riding) and 
Precisionist (Gary Stevens on board), who finished second and third respectively, as well as the European star Triptych, who finished sixth.

Sent back to race at age five, Skywalker was second in the Arcadia Handicap and third in the Goodwood Handicap.

Stud record
Retired to stud duty at Cardiff Stud Farm in Creston, California, he  sired  Bertrando, the 1993 Eclipse Award winner for American Champion Older Male Horse. Another notable son is Sky Terrace (2002 winnings: 16 starts: 4 - 1 - 2, $218,709 - 1st Derby Trial Stakes-G3 2nd Le-Comte S. 3rd Lafayette Stakes-G3, Northern Dancer Stakes). Skywalker was also the damsire of Sky Jack, a Hollywood Gold Cup winner.
Skywalker was moved to his birthplace at Stone Farm in 1996 and died of a heart attack at age 21 on February 25, 2003. He is buried in the Stone Farm equine cemetery.

Pedigree

References

 Skywalker's pedigree and partial racing stats
 Skywalker's February 25, 2003 obituary at Bloodhorse.com

1982 racehorse births
2003 racehorse deaths
Racehorses bred in Kentucky
Racehorses trained in the United States
Breeders' Cup Classic winners
Thoroughbred family 2-d
Godolphin Arabian sire line